Fredegunde, Neustria kuninganna is a novel by Estonian author Raivo Seppo. It was first published in 2006.

Estonian novels
2006 novels